Ashmont Productions was an American television production company. The company was founded by William Asher and his then wife Elizabeth Montgomery initially as a production company for the television series Bewitched.

The production company also became a production venue for several other ABC shows until the studio's close in 1976.

History

Ashmont Productions was formed in 1965 by director William Asher and his then-wife, actress Elizabeth Montgomery. Montgomery was the star of ABC's Bewitched and husband Asher directed it. The production company's original purpose was exclusively as a production outlet for Bewitched. The name "Ashmont" was a combination of the first syllables of Asher's and Montgomery's names. The combination of the couple's names was very similar to rival Desilu Productions, formed by Desi Arnaz and Lucille Ball. 

However, in 1965, the company only had one production credit on a season 1 episode of Bewitched. The company did not become active again until the start of the eighth and final season of the show in 1971. After Bewitched, Ashmont produced The Paul Lynde Show and Temperatures Rising. The production company closed its doors in 1976 after the filming of the original pilot for the television series Tabitha.

Productions by Ashmont

References

Mass media companies disestablished in 1976
Mass media companies established in 1965
Defunct companies based in California
Defunct film and television production companies of the United States
Television production companies of the United States
1965 establishments in California
1976 disestablishments in California
Bewitched